Mario Jose Santiago Hernandez (born December 16, 1984) is a baseball pitcher who is a free agent. He bats and throws right-handed.

Career 
Santiago was picked by the Kansas City Royals in the 2005 Major League Baseball draft and played for various minor league affiliates of the Royals between 2005 and 2011 including 19 games with the AAA Omaha Storm Chasers in 2011. In December 2011, Kansas City announced that they had granted Santiago his release so that he could sign to play with SK Wyverns in the Korea Baseball Organization. He was 6-3 with a 3.40 ERA in Korea  and lost two games in the 2012 Korean Series.

In January 2013, he signed a minor league contract with the Los Angeles Dodgers.

He pitched for the Puerto Rico national baseball team in the 2013 World Baseball Classic, pitching 4.1 scoreless innings in Puerto Rico's upset victory over Japan in the WBC semi-final game, before leaving the game with a sore arm. Because of his injury he spent the entire 2013 season on the disabled list.

References

External links
 
 Career statistics and player information from Korea Baseball Organization

1984 births
Living people
SSG Landers players
People from Guayama, Puerto Rico
Puerto Rican expatriate baseball players in South Korea
Puerto Rican expatriate baseball players in Japan
KBO League pitchers
Hanshin Tigers players
Puerto Rican baseball players
Arizona League Royals players
Idaho Falls Chukars players
Burlington Bees players
Wilmington Blue Rocks players
Northwest Arkansas Naturals players
Omaha Storm Chasers players
Place of birth missing (living people)
2013 World Baseball Classic players
2017 World Baseball Classic players